Çorman (also, Chorman) is a village in the Kalbajar Rayon of Azerbaijan.

References 

Populated places in Kalbajar District